At least two ships of the Iranian Navy have been named Damavand:

 , formerly the  HMS Sluys acquired in 1967 and named Artemiz. She was renamed in 1985 and stricken around 1996
 , a  launched in 2013

ship names